One More Grain is an experimental British rock band. The band is fronted by singer and multi-instrumentalist Daniel Patrick Quinn.

History
Born in Lancaster, England, Quinn attended the town's Royal Grammar School but left after GCSEs to complete his A-levels at the local college. He went on to study Philosophy at university in London. After graduating, Quinn moved to Edinburgh, where he worked in the Scottish National Gallery and set up Suilven Recordings, an independent label releasing ambient music. Quinn lived in Scotland for around three years, culminating in the release of the record Ridin' the Stang, which was subsequently toured with a group of local musicians called The Rough Ensemble. Stewart Lee featured Quinn's track "The Burryman" on his Topography of Chance CD.

Ridin' the Stang was critically acclaimed including in The Times, but Quinn returned to London, where he took up residence in a former pub, The Milton Arms, in the east of the city. He began recruiting musicians for a new musical project, meeting Andrew Blick, a trumpeter, author and former session musician previously of the jazz/techno duo Blowpipe, a French stand-up bass player called DuDu Froment, and Israeli drummer Gal Moore. The quartet began to rehearse in the old pub's cellar and wrote material for an album.

The band reached an agreement with Victory Garden Records to release their album. During this period Froment and Moore were replaced by Merek Cooper and Laurie Waller (on bass and drums respectively). Their record Pigeon English (featuring the original band lineup) was released in April 2007, following which they were described in a review for The Sunday Times (1 April 2007) as "Great English talent".

The band's second album, Isle of Grain, was released on White Heat Records on 28 January 2008. The album predominantly featured the new line-up of the band, but with some tracks from earlier sessions featuring Froment and Moore. Andrew Blick's father Robin Blick also guested on clarinet and tenor saxophone. In a pre-release review in Plan B  magazine, a reviewer questioned whether the band were "actually some elaborate practical joke". The album was named Album of the Week by the Sunday Times and received airplay on BBC Radio 1.

The band went on hiatus in mid-2008, and Quinn taught English in Southeast Asia. A posthumous 7" single featuring a One More Grain version of the traditional English song "Scarborough Fair" was released via Static Caravan in 2008.

All the members of One More Grain also participated in Andrew Blick's parallel project Gyratory System, which continued following the breakup of One More Grain.

In May 2014 it was announced that Quinn had moved to the Outer Hebrides and had resumed work with Blick on a third One More Grain album entitled Grain Fever.

A compilation of rare and unreleased material was released in 2021.  and a fourth One More Grain studio album titled 'Beans On Toast With Pythagoras' was released in 2022 via Bandcamp, in addition to an Indonesian gamelan interpretation of previous One More Grain pieces. 

According to Bandcamp, a new One More Grain album is due out on February 1, 2023.

Group members
 Daniel Patrick Quinn - vocals, Juno synthesizer, guitar, violin, harmonica, oud, wine glasses, gas canisters, maracas, production
 Andrew Blick - trumpet (and trumpet mouthpiece), programming, sound treatments, laptop computer, garagak, tbilet
 Robin Blick - brass and woodwind (2021-present)
 Merek Cooper - guitars, percussion, synths, vocals (2007-2008, 2021-present)

Previous group members
 Dudu Froment - double bass, fretless bass guitar (2006-2007)
 Gal Moore - drums (2006-2007)
 Laurie Waller - drums and percussion (2007-2008)

Additional or temporary live musicians
 Kev Campbell - guitar and synth (live performances 2007-2008)
 Stuart Humpage - guitar (live performances 2007)
 Stephen Collins - drums (live session 2007)
 Darryl Woollaston - guitar (live performance 2007)
 James Weaver - guitar (live performance 2008)

Discography

Albums
 Pigeon English (Victory Garden) 2007
 Isle of Grain (White Heat) 2008
 Grain Fever (self-released) 2015
 Grain Gamelan (self-released gamelan versions performed by Iwan Gunawan and his ensemble) 2022
 Beans On Toast With Pythagoras (self-released) 2022
 One More Grain (self-released) 2023

Compilations
 Everything Becomes Normal (self-released) 2014
 Swirling In The Backyard volume 2 / Sulawesi (self-released) 2021
 Swirling In The Backyard volume 3 / Boroughbridge (self-released) 2022

Singles
 "Live in Brighton" (Victory Garden / Static Caravan, 3" cd) 2007
 "Having A Ball" (White Heat, 7" single) 2008
 "Scarborough Fair" b/w "Giriama Wedding" (Static Caravan, 7" single) 2008

References

External links
 Gunung.org
 Bandcamp
 Quinn's Java

English rock music groups